"Wilder Days" is a song written by Michael Bonagura and Craig Bickhardt, and recorded by American country music group Baillie & the Boys.  It was released in December 1987 as the third single from the album Baillie & the Boys.  The song reached #9 on the Billboard Hot Country Singles & Tracks chart. Wilder Days was also recorded by The Ozark Mountain Daredevils on their "''Modern History'", album.

Chart performance

References

1988 singles
Baillie & the Boys songs
Songs written by Craig Bickhardt
Song recordings produced by Kyle Lehning
RCA Records singles
1987 songs
Songs written by Michael Bonagura